Poyang Lake (Gan: Po-yong U), located in Jiujiang, is the largest freshwater lake in China.

The lake is fed by the Gan, Xin, and Xiu rivers, which connect to the Yangtze through a channel.

The area of Poyang Lake fluctuates dramatically between the wet and dry seasons, but in recent years the size of the lake has been decreasing overall. In a normal year the area of the lake averages . The lake provides a habitat for half a million migratory birds and is a favorite destination for birding.

During the winter, the lake becomes home to many migrating Siberian cranes, up to 90% of which spend the winter there.

Formation

Poyang Lake has also been called Pengli Lake historically, but they are not the same. Before the Han Dynasty, the Yangtze followed a more northerly course through what is now Longgan Lake whilst Pengli Marsh formed the lower reaches of the Gan River. The area that is now Poyang Lake was a plain along the Gan River. Around 400 AD, the Yangtze River switched to a more southerly course, causing the Gan River to back up and form Lake Poyang. The backing up of the Gan River drowned Poyang County and Haihun County, forcing a mass migration to Wucheng Township in what is now Yongxiu County. Wucheng thus became one of the great ancient townships of Jiangxi Province. This migration gave birth to the phrase, "Drowning Haihun County gives rise to Wucheng Township".

Lake Poyang reached its greatest size during the Tang Dynasty, when its area reached .

Environmental issues

Loss of wildlife 
A fishing ban has been in place since 2002. In January 2020, China imposed a 10-year fishing moratorium on 332 sites along the Yangtze, including Poyang Lake to protect marine biodiversity.

In 2007 fears were expressed that China's finless porpoise, locally known as the jiangzhu ("river pig"), a native of the lake along with other waters such as Dongting Lake, might follow the baiji, the Yangtze river dolphin, into extinction. Calls have been made for action to be taken to save the porpoise, of which there are about 1,400 left, with between 700 and 900 in the Yangtze, and another about 500 in Poyang and Dongting Lakes. 2007 population levels are less than half the 1997 levels, and the population is dropping at a rate of 7.3 percent per year.

Sand dredging has become a mainstay of local economic development in the last few years, and is an important source of revenue in the region that borders Poyang Lake. But at the same time, high-density dredging projects have been the principal cause of the death of the local wildlife population. Dredging makes the waters of the lake muddier, and the porpoises cannot see as far as they once could, and have to rely on their highly developed sonar systems to avoid obstacles and look for food. Large ships enter and leave the lake at the rate of two per minute and such a high density of shipping means the porpoises have difficulty hearing their food, and also cannot swim freely from one bank to the other.

Furthermore, construction of Poyang Lake Dam is expected to cause devastating effects on the remaining porpoises.

Shrinkage 
Due to the Three Gorges Dam upriver on the Yangtze river, Poyang Lake can seasonally shrink and dry up.

In 2012, the lake nearly dried up completely.  of land was underwater in October, while the lake is normally  in area when full. In addition to the Three Gorges Dam, which must store water in its reservoir to be usable in winter, a drought was also blamed for the shrinkage.

The Jiangxi local government has proposed to build the Poyang Lake Dam to maintain water levels in the lake, building a sluice wall across the connection between the lake and the Yangtze river. An environmental impact assessment is pending. Scientists, as well as environmental groups such as the World Wide Fund for Nature, have criticized the proposal, arguing that artificially engineering water levels in the lake will adversely affect wildlife diversity.

In history
In 1363, the Battle of Lake Poyang took place there; the battle is claimed to be the largest naval battle in history.

References

External links
 Chinadialogue.net:  Saving the finless porpoise

Poyang
Bodies of water of Jiangxi
Shangrao
Yangtze River
Ramsar sites in China